Ultra Pirineu is an international skyrunning competition held for the first time in 2009 under the name Cavalls del Vent. It has been known as Ultra Pirineu since the 2014 edition. It takes place in Bagà, Spain, in September each year. The race has formed part of the Skyrunner World Series.

Races
 Ultra Pirineu Marathon, an Ultra SkyMarathon (110 km / 6800 m elevation)
 Pirineu Marathon, a SkyMarathon (45 km / 2400 m elevation)
 Nit Pirineu, a Vertical Kilometer (5 km / 860 m elevation)

Editions

See also 
 Skyrunner World Series

References

External links 
 Official web site

Skyrunning competitions
Skyrunner World Series
Athletics competitions in Spain
Berguedà